Morgan Mill Independent School District is a public school district based in the community of Morgan Mill, Texas (USA).

The district has one school - Morgan Mill Elementary - that serves students in grades Pre-K through eighth.

In 2009, the school district was rated "exemplary" by the Texas Education Agency.

However, in 2018 the school district was rated as 'Needs Improvement' by the Texas Education Agency. The following year, in 2019, the school district received a ‘B’ rating from TEA, lifting the ‘Needs Improvement” status.

References

External links
Morgan Mill ISD

School districts in Erath County, Texas
1879 establishments in Texas
School districts established in 1879